Robina Suwol is an American business executive, the founder and executive director of California Safe Schools a children's environmental health and justice coalition founded in 1998.

Awards and recognition
Suwol is a two-time Volvo Hero Award recipient (third and fifth), Environmental Protection Agency Region IX - 2007 Environmental Award, Women of Spirit Award, and Los Angeles Children's Council Leading Boldly Award, South Coast Air Quality Management District Environmental Stewardship Award, 2007 U.S. Western Pollution Prevention Hero, Prevention Magazine Hero, 1st Amendment Coalition’s 2009 Beacon Award, Charles Gibbs 2009 Environmental Award, City of Los Angeles Mayor’s Angel Award, WebMD 2012 Health Hero, and 2013 Francis Eleanor Smith, “Helping the Helpless Children” Award.

UTNE Reader named Suwol “One of  Fifty Visionaries Who are Changing the World". Articles about her have appeared in Ladies Home Journal, Child Magazine, Parent, Prevention Magazine, National Safety Council magazine, Children's Advocate, as well as the Los Angeles Times, and the Los Angeles Daily News.
Suwol is the mother of designer Brandon Stirling Baker

References
California Safe Schools Executive Director Named One of Nation's Top Hometown Heroes
https://la.indymedia.org/news/2005/02/122738.php

EPA honors Pacific Southwest environmental heroes
https://archive.epa.gov/epapages/newsroom_archive/newsreleases/f91f51a3ebc5d954852572bf0081f95b.html

South Coast Air Quality Management Interview-Robina Suwol
https://www.youtube.com/watch?v=oT7ezNkMN3s

Mothers, teachers concerned about leukemia deaths at California elementary school
https://en.wikinews.org/wiki/Mothers,_teachers_concerned_about_leukemia_deaths_at_California_elementary_school

LA environmental school site in toxic soil cleanup
https://www.nydailynews.com/sdut-la-environmental-school-site-in-toxic-soil-cleanup-2010sep12-story.html

A crusader for California’s kids
https://jewishjournal.com/tag/robina-suwol/

Los Angeles County Want Bigger Role As Toxic Watchdogs
https://www.dailynews.com/2016/12/23/la-county-public-health-officials-want-bigger-role-as-toxic-watchdogs/

Local Pesticide Concerns Lead To Positive Changes In Public Schools
https://losangeles.cbslocal.com/top-lists/local-pesticide-concerns-lead-to-positive-changes-in-public-schools/

California Safe Schools Honors Environmental and Educational Leaders
http://www.sanfernandosun.com/news/article_44145bd6-9c0f-11e6-b18a-f741edcfc16f.html

2015 Carl Gibbs Environmental Award
http://www.cityofcalabasas.com/environmental/carl-gibbs.html

2017 Dangerman Hero Awards
https://dangermanheroawards.com/2017-recipients/

2019 AQMD Clean Air Award Honorees
http://www.aqmd.gov/clean-air-awards/award-winners

Robina Suwol  -IMDB
https://www.imdb.com/name/nm0839353/

External links
 California Safe Schools Official site

American business executives
Year of birth missing (living people)
Living people
Grant High School (Portland, Oregon) alumni
Women business executives